The Finnish Hound (suomenajokoira, Finnish Bracke) is a breed of dog originally bred for hunting hare and fox.

Description

Appearance
The nob of the Finnish Hound is short, dense and coarse to the touch. The coat pattern is tricolor with tan, a black saddle and small white markings on head, feet, chest and tail tip. Height is commonly 20-24 inches (52–61 cm) and weight 45-55 pounds (20–25 kg).

Temperament
The Finnish Hound is friendly, calm and never aggressive. It is energetic in the hunt and is a versatile tracker. It works independently and pursues the quarry with passionate barking.

Care

Exercise
Finnish Hounds are energetic working dogs with great stamina. They need long, brisk daily walking, and plenty of running and playing free. Life expectancy is about 12 years.

Grooming
The smooth, short haired coat is easy to maintain. The brushing can be done with a firm bristle brush, and dry shampoo may be used occasionally if needed. The coat does not need bathing unless extremely dirty. Finnish hounds are average shedders.

Cerebellar ataxia

Finnish Hounds suffer from an inherited disease, cerebellar ataxia, forcing people to euthanize many puppies. This has been traced to a single mutation in a gene called SEL1L. Mutant cells suffer disruptions in their endoplasmic reticula, leading to disease. It is hoped that a test will be developed to screen for this mutation and eventually breed it out of the population.

History
The Finnish Hound was a result of a breeding programme in the 1800s, which involved French, German and Swedish hounds. The goal was to develop a hound dog that could work on hilly terrain and in deep snow. The Finnish Hound has become one of Finland's most popular dog breeds. Although the breed is very popular in Finland and Sweden, it is quite uncommon elsewhere.

See also
 Dogs portal
 List of dog breeds
Scenthound
Alpine Dachsbracke
Westphalian Dachsbracke
Drever
Scenthound Group

References 

Dog breeds originating in Finland
FCI breeds
Scent hounds